The 1989–90 Courage League was the third season of competitive league rugby union in England.

Wasps were the champions, beating Gloucester by just one point. Bedford were relegated.

Participating teams

Table

Results
The home team is listed in the left column.

References

External links
 Official website

Premiership Rugby seasons
 
English